Karl Haacker (25 July 1890 – 15 December 1945) was a German art director active in designing film sets during the Weimar and Nazi eras. He is sometimes credited as Carl Haacker.

Selected filmography
 The Student of Prague (1935)
 A Wedding Dream (1936)
 The Night With the Emperor (1936)
 Dangerous Game (1937)
 The Citadel of Warsaw (1937)
 A Girl Goes Ashore (1938)
 Nanette (1940)
 Beloved Augustin (1940)
 Our Miss Doctor (1940)

References

Bibliography
 Lotte H. Eisner. The Haunted Screen: Expressionism in the German Cinema and the Influence of Max Reinhardt. University of California Press, 2008.

External links

1890 births
1945 deaths
German art directors
Film people from Berlin